Bashar Masri (// February 3, 1961) is a Palestinian entrepreneur and businessman. He is the founder and Chairman of the Board of  International since its establishment in 1994. He is the founder and visionary behind the high-tech "City”, Palestine's first planned city, he is also the founder and the CEO of  Real Estate Investment Company that built the city. He founded and manages the first Palestinian equity fund, a $90 million investment initiative known as " Fund". He's on the list of the "Top Ten Richest People of Palestine in 2016." Masri was named by the World Economic Forum as a Global Leader of Tomorrow and ranked among the World's 50 Greatest Leaders in 2018 by Fortune magazine.

Bashar Masri serves as chairman of the Board of Directors of the Palestine Development and Investment Company  Like, PADICO's mission is to contribute significantly to the strengthening and expansion of the Palestinian national economy. PADICO has made large-scale investments in vital industrial sectors including real estate, telecommunications, tourism, industry, agriculture, environment, energy and financial services, employing thousands of Palestinians.

Early life 
Masri was born and raised in Nablus, Palestine.  After leaving Nablus, Masri continued his education in Egypt, before moving to the United States, where he graduated from Virginia Tech with a B.S. in Chemical Engineering in 1983.

Career
Masri worked in a number of countries, including the Kingdom of Saudi Arabia, the United States and the United Kingdom, before he decided to return to Palestine and settle there in the mid-1994. He has a strong background in management consulting and industrial management.

On a regional level, Masri has spearheaded large and economically significant investment projects, including affordable housing communities in Morocco, commercial and residential developments in Jordan, and a residential real estate project in Egypt. Massar Company under Masri's management currently has multiple businesses in Morocco, Jordan, Egypt and Serbia.

Business in Palestine

Al-Ayyam Newspaper 
After Masri came back from Washington DC to Palestine in Mid-1990s to establish himself in his home country, he started by founding Palestinians daily newspaper "Al-Ayyam Newspaper (/Arabic: جريدة الأيام/)" and was its publisher. Al Ayyam is today the second largest newspaper in Palestine.

Massar International Ltd 
In 1994, Masri founded and now is the chairman of the board of Massar International, since the establishment of Massar, he has been one of the most prominent figures promoting private sector development and growth in Palestine.He has dedicated his life to establishing, investing, transforming, networking, training and building what is now a widely known group of businesses bridging Palestine to global technologies, knowledge, know-how and industry best practices. In the past decade, he has launched businesses in financial services, real estate, media and communications, retail businesses, agribusiness and information technology.

Rawabi City & Bayti Real Estate 
Masri is the visionary and founder of Rawabi City, and oversees the construction and development of the city. Rawabi City is a high-tech planned city, the first of its kind in Palestine, and it was funded fully by the private sector, Rawabi is considered the largest private sector investment is Palestine's history, the construction of the city so far has cost 1.4 billion dollars. Rawabi is being constructed by Bayti Real Estate Investment Company that is jointly owned by Qatari Diar Real Estate Investment Company and Massar International. With its more than 6,000 housing units built to serve families from multiple demographics, state-of-the-art infrastructure, and an emerging commercial hub, the city has already made a positive economic and social impact on Palestinians and it is constructed to provide housing for 25,000 person in its first stage and 40,000 people when it is done. Not only does the city provide affordable housing options it is also the second biggest generator of jobs, after the Palestinian Government, providing between 8,000 and 10,000 job opportunity a year for construction workers, in addition to thousands of job opportunities, whether in Massar International companies that moved there, or in the different shops and entertainment facilities the city provides.

Masri aims for the City of Rawabi to be the Silicon Valley and the Tech Hub for the State of Palestine, in attempts to provide spaces for promising technology and technology related startups at the city, and businesses from inside and outside of Palestine to the city.

In July 2022, Apple Inc.Apple announced that the company would be expanding their research and development centre in Rawabi. The expansion will take place via hiring contractor ASAL Technologies and Masri in order to achive the expansion.

Siraj Fund Management Company 
Masri founded and manages the first Palestinian equity fund, a 90 million investment initiative known as "Siraj Fund" in 2003, and the company's first fun "Siraj Palestine Fund I" was launched in February 2011, the company was founded for the sole purpose of managing investment funds in Palestine. The company focuses on promising startups and capital investments in small and medium-sized enterprises in the sectors of  information and communication technology services, energy, agriculture, clean technology, healthcare, logistics, education, manufacturing, transportation, construction and financial services. Siraj's investments in these companies range between $250,000 and $12 million, and plans on expanding in the MENA region in the future.

Personal life
Masri is the father of two daughters: Tamara Masri and Dina Masri.

Awards and positions 
Masri is the former Palestinian Chapter Chairman of the Young Presidents' Organization (YPO). He was named as a "Global Leader of Tomorrow" by the World Economic Forum. Masri serves on the Board of Trustees of An-Najah National University. Masri is a member of the Deans’ Council of the John F. Kennedy School of Government at Harvard University.

Fortune Magazine ranked Masri #38 on its list of "The World's 50 Greatest Leaders".

References

External links

 Profile

Real estate and property developers
Chief executive officers in the real estate industry
Palestinian chief executives
Palestinian company founders
Real estate company founders
Palestinian engineers
Chemical engineers
Palestinian emigrants to the United States
People from Nablus
People from Ramallah
1961 births
Living people